Alexander Zakharov (born 12 June 1993) is a Russian professional basketball player who last played for Juventus Utena of the Lithuanian Basketball League.

Trophies

BC Khimki
Eurocup Basketball: (1)
2015

References

External links
Alexander Zakharov at Eurocup Basketball
 
 
 

1993 births
Living people
BC Khimki players
BC Nizhny Novgorod players
Russian men's basketball players
Russian men's 3x3 basketball players
Power forwards (basketball)